Raj Kumar Kapoor (  10 April 2019) was an Indian actor, producer and director. He was a colonel in Indian Army.
He was also known as Raj Bharti and many movies credited this name.

Biography
Kapoor was the director of a television series titled Fauji which was the debut work of Shah Rukh Khan. He produced Oonche Log too. He was involved in acting in films too. He authored a novel titled When Shiva Smiles.

Kapoor died on 10 April 2019 at the age of 87.

Selected filmography

Actor

 Hanste Zakhm (1973)
Lahu Ke Do Rang (1979 film) as Dr Banerjee 
 Dostana (1980)
 Do Premee (1980) as Mahayogi/Shivlal/Dragon, Smuggler
 Partner (1982)
 Yeh Nazdeekiyan (1982) as Deepak Kapoor
 Dard Ka Rishta (1982) as Pathan Khan, Security Guard 
 Angoor (1982) as Inspector Sinha.
 Chatpati (1983)
Yahan Wahan (1984) .... Mr Kapoor 
 Inteha (1984)
 Jawaab (1985)
 Sasti Dulhan Mahenga Dulha (1986)
 Baazigar (1993) as Police Commissioner 
 Dillagi (1999)

Producer
 Oonche Log (1985)

Director
 Fauji (1988–89)

References

External links

1930s births
2019 deaths
Indian television directors
Hindi film producers
Male actors in Hindi cinema
Indian male novelists